Effective Altruism Global, abbreviated EA Global or EAG, is a series of philanthropy conferences that focuses on the effective altruism movement. The conferences are run by the Centre for Effective Altruism. Huffington Post editor Nico Pitney described the events as a gathering of "nerd altruists", which was "heavy on people from technology, science, and analytical disciplines".

History

The first Effective Altruism Summit was hosted in 2013.

In 2015, there were three main EA Global events. The largest was a three-day conference that took place on the Google campus in Mountain View, California, with speakers including entrepreneur Elon Musk, computer scientist Stuart J. Russell, and Oxford philosophy professor William MacAskill. There were also conferences in Oxford and Melbourne. According to MacAskill, the nature of the conferences improved coordination and ideological diversity within effective altruism. Talks included subjects such as global poverty, animal advocacy, cause prioritization research, and policy change. There were also workshops on career choice, Q&A sessions, and panels on running local effective altruism chapters.

One of the key events of the Google conference was a moderated panel on existential risk from artificial general intelligence. Panel member Stuart Russell stated that AI research should be about "building intelligent systems that benefit the human race". Vox writer Dylan Matthews, while praising some aspects of the conference, criticized its perceived focus on existential risk, potentially at the expense of more mainstream causes like fighting extreme poverty.

Since 2016, conferences have taken place at Harvard University, University of California, Berkeley, The Palace of Fine Arts, Imperial College London and other venues in Boston, Berkeley, San Francisco and London. Because of the COVID-19 pandemic, no events were held in 2020; instead, a number of virtual conferences and virtual programs were offered. Activity resumed in late October 2021, with an event held at The Brewery in London. Three EA Global events are planned for 2022.

References

External links
 

Annual events in the United States
Philanthropy
Altruism
Centre for Effective Altruism